Milirrpum v Nabalco Pty Ltd, also known as the Gove land rights case because its subject was land known as the Gove Peninsula in the Northern Territory, was the first litigation on native title in Australia, and the first significant legal case for Aboriginal land rights in Australia, decided on 27 April 1971.

The decision of Justice Richard Blackburn ruled against the Yolngu claimants on a number of issues of law and fact, rejecting the doctrine of Aboriginal title. Instead his ruling recognised that in the law of the time of British colonisation of Australia there was a distinction between settled colonies, where the land, being "desert and uncultivated", was claimed by right of occupancy, and conquered or ceded colonies. The decision also noted that the Crown had the power to extinguish native title, if it existed.

The issue of terra nullius was not contemplated in the case. Although Milirrpum was not appealed beyond the Supreme Court of the Northern Territory, it was overruled by the High Court of Australia two decades later in Mabo v Queensland (No 2), when the notion of terra nullius was found to be false.

Background

The Yolngu people, the traditional owners of Arnhem Land (which includes the Gove Peninsula), had petitioned the Australian House of Representatives in August 1963 with a bark petition after the government had sold part of the Arnhem Land reserve on 13 March of that year to a bauxite mining company, Nabalco without consultation with the traditional owners at the time. However, in 1968 the Commonwealth government granted a special mineral lease to the company over the land for a period of 42 years.

In December 1968, the Yolngu people living in Yirrkala, represented by three plaintiffs, obtained writs in the Supreme Court of the Northern Territory against the Nabalco Corporation, which had secured a 12-year bauxite mining lease from the Federal Government. The plaintiffs were Milirrpum Marika, elder of the Rirratjingu clan; Munffaraway, elder of the Gumatj clan, and Daymbalipu, an elder of the Djapu clan, who represented that clan as well as acting on behalf of 11 other peoples with interests in the land. The plaintiffs' lawyers were Edward Woodward, Frank Purcell, John Little and John Fogarty. The plaintiffs claimed they enjoyed sovereignty over their land, and sought the freedom to occupy their lands.

The applicants asserted before the Court that since time immemorial, they held a “communal native title” that had not been validly extinguished, or acquired under the Lands Acquisition Act 1955 (Cth), and should be recognised as an enforceable proprietary right. The lengthy legal battle culminated in 1971.

Ruling
Justice Blackburn found that the Yolngu people could not prevent mining on their lands. He held that native title was not part of the law of Australia, and even had it existed, any native title rights had been extinguished. Further, even if extinguishment had not occurred, the plaintiffs were not able to prove native title.

Blackburn rejected the claim on the bases that:
A doctrine of common law native title had no place in a settled colony except under express statutory provisions (i.e. the recognition doctrine).
Under the recognition doctrine, pre-existing interests were not recognised unless they were rights of private property and, while the community possessed a legal system, it was not proved that under that legal system, the claimant clans possessed such rights.
The clan’s relationship to land was therefore not a “right ... in connection with the land” under the Lands Acquisition Act 1955.
On the balance of probabilities, the applicants had not shown that, in 1788, their ancestors had the same links to the same areas of land that they were now claiming.

The terms "settled" and "desert and uncultivated" included territory in which resided "uncivilized inhabitants in a primitive state of society". In such a territory, the laws of England (unless inconsistent with local laws) were imported when sovereignty was acquired. The doctrine of continuity did not relate to settled colonies, and therefore, "if there were no local laws then there were no rights of property to respect". A distinction between settled and conquered colonies was drawn. The decision also noted that the Crown had the power to extinguish native title, if it existed.

Blackburn examined comparative Commonwealth, Canadian, New Zealand and US jurisprudence. He accepted that the applicants had established that under traditional law any given part of the land could be “attributed”  to a particular clan, but held that this did not amount to a proprietary interest.  He also found that the evidence did not establish the landholding model asserted. Blackburn acknowledged for the first time in an Australian higher court the existence of a system of Aboriginal law. He also recognised the validity of the use of oral evidence to establish property rights, normally inadmissible, but a vital precondition for a successful land rights case, and he also acknowledged the claimants' ritual and economic use of the land.

Blackburn acknowledged the claimants' ritual and economic use of the land and that they had an established system of law "a subtle and highly elaborate" system of laws (Madayin). The judgement concludes: "I cannot help being specially conscious that for the plaintiffs it is a matter in which their personal feelings are involved". In a confidential memorandum to the Government and Opposition, he opined that a system of Aboriginal land rights was "morally right and socially expedient".

Consequences
There was a deliberate decision to pursue a political course rather than legal challenge to the High Court of Australia, which at the time because of the membership of the Court was likely to reject Blackburn’s finding that there was a coherent system of Aboriginal law relating to land. By not having the appeal rejected by the High Court, the findings of Justice Blackburn that were favourable to the plaintiffs (and by extension to other Aboriginal Australian peoples), and thus the concept of land rights, was maintained as a possibility, at least until the membership of the High Court had changed.

Milirrpum led to the establishment of the Woodward Royal Commission by the Whitlam Government in 1973–4, and the eventual recognition of Aboriginal Land rights in the Northern Territory. In 1975, shortly before he was dismissed, Prime Minister Gough Whitlam drew up the Aboriginal Land Rights Act 1976 which was later passed (in a slightly diluted form) by the conservative Fraser Government on 9 December 1976.

The court interpreter for the case was  Galarrwuy Yunupingu, the son of a Gumatj clan leader, Munggurrawuy, who was one of the Yirrkala plaintiffs. Galarrwuy had earlier helped his father draft the Yirrkala bark petitions. He later became chairman of the Northern Land Council and in 1978 became Australian of the Year for his work on Indigenous rights.

The issue of terra nullius, which was not contemplated in this decision, was later raised and recognised in Mabo v Queensland (No 2) (1992), which overturned the Blackburn ruling.

See also
 List of Australian Native Title court cases
 Where the Green Ants Dream

References

Further reading

Native title case law in Australia
Aboriginal land rights in Australia
Northern Territory case law
1971 in case law
1971 in Australian law
Yolngu
Australian Indigenous law